Lusina  is a village in the administrative district of Gmina Mogilany, within Kraków County, Lesser Poland Voivodeship, in southern Poland.

Education

International School of Kraków is in Lusina.

References

Lusina